Craker is a surname. Notable people with the surname include:

 Chris Craker (born 1959), British clarinetist
 Laurie Craker (1953–2020), English footballer and manager
 Lorilee Craker (born 1968), Canadian American journalist
 Lyle Craker (born 1950), American botanist